Yên Cư station is a railway station in Vietnam. It serves the town of Hạ Long, in Quảng Ninh Province.

Buildings and structures in Quảng Ninh province
Railway stations in Vietnam